"Christmas (Baby Please Come Home)" is a pop song originally sung by Darlene Love and included on the 1963 seasonal compilation album, A Christmas Gift for You from Phil Spector. The song was written by Ellie Greenwich, Jeff Barry, and Phil Spector.

Upon release, the song did not find commercial success but in later years, it has gone on to become a Christmas standard. It charted for the first time on the Billboard Hot 100 in 2018 and has since peaked at number 16. It has also peaked at number seven on the Holiday 100 chart. The song has been covered by Mariah Carey, Michael Bublé, and U2, among others.

Background and release
Love was given a demo of the song over the phone and went on to record the song. The song was released as a single in 1963. and in 1964 (Philles X-125). Upon release, the song was not a huge success but it has gone on to become a Christmas standard.

In 1963, Spector decided that the song was strong enough to warrant a non-seasonal version and wrote a version titled "Johnny (Baby Please Come Home)," which Love also performed. This version was released to the public in 1976 as the final track on the Spector compilation album, Rare Masters Vol. 2.

Chart performance
Despite not charting on release, the song has found commercial success in later years. The song charted on the Billboard Holiday 100 chart at number 99 on the week ending December 13, 2014, reaching a peak position of number seven, seven years later (on the week ending December 4, 2021). On the week ending December 29, 2018, the track entered the main Billboard Hot 100 chart for the first time at number 50, and attained an all-time peak position of number 16 on the week ending January 1, 2022 (upon its third chart re-entry). On the official UK Singles Chart, "Christmas (Baby Please Come Home)" made its first appearance on the week of 5 January 2017 at number 74. It entered the same chart again one year later at No. 77, and again on the week of 20 December 2018 at No. 80, eventually reaching its overall chart peak to date of No. 22 two weeks later.

Live performances
Beginning in 1986 and continuing for 29 years, Darlene Love performed the song annually on the episode before Christmas of Late Night with David Letterman (NBC, 1986–92) and Late Show with David Letterman (CBS, 1993–2014), 28 times in all. The exception was in 2007 when Love was unable to perform due to the Writers' Strike and a repeat of her 2006 performance was shown instead. She performed the song with Paul Shaffer and the show's house band (The World's Most Dangerous Band at NBC, the CBS Orchestra at CBS). Love also performed the song on December 24, 2013, in front of traders at the New York Stock Exchange as the market closed for the day. Beginning in 2015, the tradition of Love's annual performance of the song moved to The View (ABC, 2015–present), where it has continued during its last edition before Christmas in the years since, only skipping out the 2021 edition due to being exposed to a positive COVID-19 case resulting in a quarantine; a compilation of her previous performances was shown instead.

Legacy
In December 2010, Rolling Stone magazine ranked "Christmas (Baby Please Come Home)" first on its list of The Greatest Rock and Roll Christmas Songs, noting that "nobody can match Love's emotion and sheer vocal power." The song has also been used in several movies.

Cover versions

"Christmas (Baby Please Come Home)" was not widely recognized after its initial release but has gone on to be covered many times by different artists over the years. One of the early cover versions was by The Quiet Jungle for the 1968 album The Story of Snoopy's Christmas.

The song was covered by rock band U2 in 1987 during a sound check in Glasgow, Scotland during their Joshua Tree Tour. It was released on the compilation A Very Special Christmas the same year and on the album Unreleased & Rare in the digital box set The Complete U2 in 2004.

In 1994, Mariah Carey recorded a version and included it on her album Merry Christmas. Carey's version reached number 59 on Billboard's Hot Digital Songs chart in 2011 and number 20 on the US Holiday 100; the latter being the second highest position for the song on the chart after the original. She first performed her version in 2008 at The Grammy Nominations Concert Live. The song was added to her setlist for her All I Want for Christmas Is You: A Night of Joy and Festivity concert residency. In 2021, Carey covered the song again for her Christmas special Mariah's Christmas: The Magic Continues.

In 2010, Josh Ramsay from the Canadian band Marianas Trench covered the song for 604 Records' Christmas compilation album.

In 2011, Michael Bublé covered the song for his album  Christmas. In 2021, he performed the song live with Hannah Waddingham on his Christmas in the City NBC special celebrating the 10th anniversary of his Christmas album.

In 2021 Keke Palmer and the cast of Sing 2 covered the song for a 2021 Christmas commercial from Comcast's Xfinity and Sky Group and as a bonus track from the original motion picture soundtrack of the same name. Palmer and Tori Kelly performed the song live on The Voice season 21 finale with the top 13 acts. Italian singer Alexia released a cover version in November 2022 from her Christmas album My Xmas. The song has been covered by Cher, Foo Fighters,  Mister Monster, Death Cab For Cutie, Joey Ramone, Jon Bon Jovi, Jonathan Jackson, Idina Menzel, Little Mix, Noah Cyrus and The Offspring.

Love has noted that her two favourite covers of the song are Mariah Carey's, because "hers is so much like the original...with her great voice", and U2's "because it doesn't sound like "Christmas (Baby)" and they had all three background vocals on it".

Charts

Darlene Love version

Weekly charts

All-time charts

Mariah Carey version

Weekly charts

All-time charts

Michael Bublé version

Weekly charts

All-time charts

Leona Lewis version

Various artists version

Certifications and sales

Darlene Love version

Mariah Carey version

Michael Bublé version

Personnel
 Lead vocals by Darlene Love
 Backing vocals by: Cher and The Blossoms (Fanita James, Darlene Love, Gracia Nitzsche, Edna Wright, and Carolyn Willis)
 Instrumentation by The Wrecking Crew:
 Jack Nitzsche – arrangements, percussion
 Steve Douglas – saxophone
 Jay Migliori – saxophone
 Hal Blaine – drums
 Louis Blackburn – horns
 Leon Russell – piano
 Roy Caton – trumpet
 Sonny Bono – percussion
 Frank Capp – percussion
 Ray Pohlman – bass
 Irv Rubins – guitar
 Barney Kessel – guitar
 Bill Pitman – guitar
Tommy Tedesco – guitar
 Nino Tempo – guitar
 Johnny Vidor – strings
 Larry Levine – engineer

References

External links
 [ Christmas (Baby Please Come Home)] – Allmusic listing
 Christmas (Baby Please Come Home) –  Reason To Rock critique

1963 songs
American Christmas songs
Songs written by Ellie Greenwich
Songs written by Jeff Barry
Songs written by Phil Spector
U2 songs
Mariah Carey songs
Darlene Love songs
Song recordings produced by Phil Spector
Song recordings with Wall of Sound arrangements
Songs about loneliness